Neoromicia robtertsi is a species of vesper bat found in Madagascar.
It is a recently described species, as it was first described in 2012.

Taxonomy and etymology
It was described as a new species in 2012.
The holotype had been collected in 2002 in a montane forest relatively undisturbed by human impacts.
The eponym for the species name "robertsi" is Austin Roberts, a zoologist who studied the bats of southern Africa and devised ways to distinguish species into genera.
Its sister taxa is Neoromicia malagasyensis.

Description
Its fur is chocolate brown and distinctly long.
Its flight membranes, ears, and tragi are blackish-brown.

Range and habitat
It is endemic to Madagascar, where it is found on the eastern half of the island.
Part of its range overlaps with Andasibe-Mantadia National Park.

Conservation
As of 2017, it is evaluated as a data deficient species by the IUCN.
It meets the criteria for this classification because it was recently described and little data has been collected on it so far.
Threats faced by this species are unknown, as it is uncommonly encountered.

References

Bats of Africa
Endemic fauna of Madagascar
Mammals of Madagascar
Mammals described in 2012
Neoromicia